Maxial da Estrada is a small village in Sertã Municipality located 5 km north of Sertã, Portugal on national road EN 238.

Local economy is based on forest exploration and subsistence agriculture. There is a timber mill, relevant to the local economy, operating in the village.

Populated places in Castelo Branco District
Villages in Portugal